Monobank is a Ukrainian online bank. Operating since 2017, it serves more than 7 million customers in Ukraine. It is the first online bank without traditional branches in Ukraine. Holds TOP2 in App Store and TOP3 in Google Play among the most popular fintech apps in Ukraine.
As all of the existing neobanks in Ukraine, it operates using a banking license of a parent bank, namely, Universal Bank, which is a part of the TAS Group and belongs to Ukrainian businessman Serhiy Tihipko. In 2018, it was recognized as the best Ukrainian FinTech startup according to PaySpace Magazine Awards and was awarded the "Neobank of the Year" title by FinAwards."

History 
Work on the product began in January 2017. From October 17 to November 22, the service was in beta testing mode, and the number of testers exceeded 17,000. The developer is Fintech Band, a company owned by Olexandr and Dmytro Dubilet, Oleg Gorokhovsky, Mykhailo Rogalsky, Volodymyr Yatsenko, Lyudmyla Shmalchenko, and Vadym Kovalyov. The application functions as a bank because Universal Bank received the right to use it from the developer company. The promotion of the product was carried out by the marketing company Promodo.

At the beginning of 2018, Fintech Band announced plans to launch a similar project in the United Kingdom called koto. In 2019, they received investments from MasterCard and obtained a license from the government of the United Kingdom. It was rebranded in 2021 as The Credit Thing.

In January 2023, it was announced that work had begun in the Polish market, where the bank is planning to launch the Stereo neobanking service.

Concept and features 
The product offers banking services without branches, with almost all services provided through a mobile application. For some operations (depositing/withdrawing foreign currency cash), services are exclusively provided through Universal Bank's or partner banks' cash desks, like A-Bank. On June 1, 2020, monobank decided to terminate its cooperation with Tascombank, as announced by Oleh Gorokhovskyi.

Customers can be owners of Apple devices running iOS 10 and Android version 4.4 or newer, who are 14 years of age or older and have a Ukrainian tax identification number. Communication between the customer and the bank takes place by phone, email, or in messengers Telegram, Rakuten Viber, Facebook Messenger, and iMessage (Apple Business Chat in Apple Messages).

Debit Mastercard World and Visa Rewards credit cards are issued. It is possible to open accounts in hryvnia, euros, and US dollars, as well as deposits in hryvnia, euros, and dollars.

Transfers between cards of this product and cards of other banks in Ukraine (up to 10,000 hryvnias per month), as well as payment of utilities and mobile phone top-ups with one's own funds, are commission-free. If transferring and withdrawing credit funds, the commission is 4%.

One of the product's features is the return of a portion of purchases - cashback. Each month, the customer can choose 2 categories and receive a certain percentage of return (from 0.75% to 20%) on purchases at points of sale in this category, as well as an unlimited number of partner cashback categories (in some cases with a fixed maximum amount and number of transactions).

Another popular feature is monobank's "jar" ( literally means "jar"), or "piggy bank". It is a special deposit account, that any client can create for themselves, their family or friends, to accumulate money for a purchase using gamification elements. Available accumulation methods can be divided into shared and individual, with the option to add a specific amount of money from any linked bank card, set up automatic top-ups, and choose various methods of deduction, such as rounding up the balance, a certain percentage of expenses, or regular automatic transfers.

Russian invasion of Ukraine  
During the Russian invasion of Ukraine, monobank jars became one of the main ways volunteers raised money for the needed supplies, either civilian or military, through social media. In November 2022 monobank's co-founder Oleh Gorokhovskyi stated that more than 6 billion hryvnias (approx. US$162 million) were collected through this feature for the Armed Forces of Ukraine since the start of the invasion. As of December 29, 2022, more than 10.6 billion hryvnias (approx. US$287 million) were collected by both big charities and small volunteers using this feature. Ukrainians created more than 100,000 new jars between February 24 and October 18, 2022. One of the most notable examples of this feature used by charities and volunteers is Serhiy Prytula Charity Foundation collecting money and subsequently purchasing a satellite from the ICEYE for Ukrainian intelligence, the project known as People's Bayraktar

On February 27, 2022, Monobank launched a landing page in English, uahelp.monobank.ua, which accepts donations from abroad using SWIFT, SEPA and Faster Payments, and transfers the incoming funds daily to the special account for the support of the Ukrainian Army of the National Bank of Ukraine. In a span of 1 year since it's launch, it attracted 59 million hryvnias (approx. US$1.6 million).

See also 
 Revolut
 Wise

References 

Banks of Ukraine
Online banks
2017 establishments in Ukraine